Herbert Ward (birth registered third ¼ 1873  – 18 February 1955) was an English rugby union footballer who played in the 1890s. He played at representative level for England, and at club level for Bradford F.C., as a fullback, i.e. number 15. Prior to Tuesday 27 August 1895, Bradford F.C. was a rugby union club, it then became a rugby league club, and since 1907 it has been the association football (soccer) club Bradford Park Avenue.

Background 
Herbert Ward's birth was registered in Bradford, West Riding of Yorkshire, England, and he died aged 81 in Wharfedale, West Riding of Yorkshire, England.

Playing career

International honours 
Herbert Ward won a cap for England while at Bradford F.C. in 1895 against Wales.

Championship final appearances

Change of Code 
When Bradford F.C. converted from the rugby union code to the rugby league code on Tuesday 27 August 1895, Herbert Ward would have been approximately 22. Subsequently, he was both a rugby union and rugby league footballer for Bradford F.C.

References

External links 
 Search for "Ward" at rugbyleagueproject.org (RL)
Search for "Herbert Ward" at britishnewspaperarchive.co.uk

1873 births
1955 deaths
Bradford F.C. players
England international rugby union players
English rugby union players
Rugby league players from Bradford
Rugby union fullbacks
Rugby union players from Bradford